Black Hill is a rural locality and suburb of Newcastle, New South Wales, Australia, located  northwest of Newcastle's central business district. It is part of the City of Newcastle and City of Cessnock local government areas.

Black Hill Public School 
Black Hill Public School is a small school located on Blackhill Road. It was founded in 1881. Notable people who received education at this school include Sydney Swans player Isaac Heeney, the grandchildren and great-grandchildren of Australian politician Milton Morris, and Reilly Stevenson who held the title of School President in 2015, along with 2 chess championship awards and 1 handball championship award.

Population
The most common responses for religion were No Religion 42.6%, Anglican 17.1% and Catholic 15.9%.

References

Suburbs of Newcastle, New South Wales
Suburbs of City of Cessnock